Broadcast Film Critics Association Awards 2006 may refer to:

 11th Critics' Choice Awards, the eleventen Critics' Choice Awards ceremony that took place in 2006
 12th Critics' Choice Awards, the twelfth Critics' Choice Awards ceremony that took place in 2007 and which honored the best in film for 2006